Bradley Mark Hope (born 13 July 1999) is an Australian cricketer. He made his first-class debut for Western Australia in the 2018–19 Sheffield Shield season on 23 February 2019. In January 2020, he was named in the Cricket Australia XI team to face the England Lions. He made his List A debut on 24 November 2021, for Tasmania in the 2021–22 Marsh One-Day Cup.

References

External links
 

1999 births
Living people
Australian cricketers
Place of birth missing (living people)
Cricket Australia XI cricketers
Tasmania cricketers
Western Australia cricketers
Cricketers from Perth, Western Australia